is a generic term for pictures of beautiful women in Japanese art, especially in woodblock printing of the ukiyo-e genre.

Definition 
 defines  as a picture that simply "emphasizes the beauty of women", and the Shincho Encyclopedia of World Art defines it as depiction of "the beauty of a woman's appearance". On the other hand,  defines  as pictures that explore "the inner beauty of women".

History 
Ukiyo-e itself is a genre of woodblock prints and paintings that was produced in Japan from the 17th century to the 19th century. The prints were very popular amongst the Japanese merchants and the middle class of the time.

From the Edo period to the Meiji period (1868-1912), the technical evolution of ukiyo-e processes increased, with the accuracy of carving and printing and the vividness of colors used developing through the introduction of new printing processes and synthetic dyes. This technical development can also be seen in ukiyo-e , and many painters of  contributed to the evolution of ukiyo-e techniques and styles, with the aim of maximizing the realistic expression of a real beauty living in the artists' time period.

Nearly all ukiyo-e artists produced , as it was one of the central themes of the genre. However, a few, including Utamaro, Suzuki Harunobu, Itō Shinsui, Toyohara Chikanobu, Uemura Shōen and Torii Kiyonaga, have been described as the greatest innovators and masters of the form.

Gallery

See also

Further reading

External links
Bijinga artworks

References

Japanese words and phrases
Female beauty
Ukiyo-e genres
Women in art